Charlon Anduele Romano Kloof (born 20 March 1990) is a Dutch-Surinamese basketball player for FC Porto in the Portuguese Basketball League. Standing at 6 ft 3 in (1.91 m), Kloof plays the point guard position and is a current member of the Dutch national basketball team.

Professional career

İstanbul DSİ
Kloof's professional career started in the 2014–15 season in the Turkish TB2L with İstanbul DSİ. He was the leading scorer of his team, with 19.8 points per game.

Rethymno Cretan Kings
He started the 2015–16 season with Rethymno Cretan Kings of the Greek Basket League, but in January he moved to Italy, where he signed for Auxilium CUS Torino of the Lega Basket Serie A.

MZT Skopje
On 23 July 2016, Kloof signed with MZT Skopje. He led Skopje to a First League championship, and was named the league's Most Valuable Player afterwards.

Murcia
On 19 July 2017, Kloof signed with UCAM Murcia of the Spanish Liga ACB and the Basketball Champions League (BCL). Kloof became the first Surinamese player to play in the Liga ACB. In the 2017–18 BCL season, Murcia reached the tournament's Final Four. Murcia finished as third after defeating Riesen Ludwigsburg in the third-place game.

Ormanspor
In July 2019, Kloof agreed on a contract with Turkish club OGM Ormanspor, newcomer in the Basketbol Süper Ligi (BSL). He averaged 9.6 points and 4.2 rebounds per game.

Andorra
On September 9, 2020, Kloof signed a two-month deal with MoraBanc Andorra of the Liga ACB. In five games, he averaged 3.0 points, 1.0 rebound and 1.0 assist per game.

Fuenlabrada
On October 29, 2020, Kloof signed with Fuenlabrada.

Return to Ormanspor
On January 2, 2021, he has signed again with Ormanspor of the Turkish Basketbol Süper Ligi (BSL).

Porto
On August 17, 2021, he has signed with FC Porto in the Portuguese Basketball League.

International career
After playing for the junior teams of the Netherlands, Kloof was selected for the Dutch national basketball team for EuroBasket 2015. In his EuroBasket debut, he scored 22 points in a 73–72 win over Georgia. Kloof averaged 16.2 points, 4.6 rebounds and 3.2 assists per game at EuroBasket 2015 as his country was eliminated in the group stage.

Statistics

|-
| style="text-align:left;"| 2015 EuroBasket
| style="text-align:left;"| 
| 5 || 5 || 29.0 || .451 || .611 || .632 || 4.6 || 3.2 || 1.0 || .2 || 16.2

References

External links
Official website
Twitter Account
FIBAEurope.com Profile
Eurobasket.com Profile
Draftexpress.com Profile
ESPN.com Profile 
RealGM.com Profile 
St. Bonaventure Bonnies bio

1990 births
Living people
ABA League players
Auxilium Pallacanestro Torino players
CB Murcia players
Dutch expatriate basketball people in Spain
Dutch expatriate basketball people in the United States
Dutch men's basketball players
FC Porto basketball players
Junior college men's basketball players in the United States
KK MZT Skopje players
Liga ACB players
OGM Ormanspor players
Point guards
Rethymno B.C. players
Sportspeople from Paramaribo
St. Bonaventure Bonnies men's basketball players
Surinamese emigrants to the Netherlands